Yannis Kapsis (1929 – 13 November 2017) was a Greek journalist and politician who was deputy foreign minister from 1982 to 1989, under Prime Minister Andreas Papandreou. 

From 1974 to 1982, he was editor of Ta Nea, then Greece's highest-circulation newspaper.

During his term of office, he negotiated the well-known moratorium between Greece and Turkey over the 1987 Aegean crisis. 

He was the father of prominent journalists Pantelis and Manolis Kapsis.

He died in Athens on 13 November 2017.

References

 1929 births
 2017 deaths
Government ministers of Greece
PASOK politicians
Greek newspaper editors
Journalists from Athens
Politicians from Athens